Guy Malachi Jones Williams (born 19 September 1987) is a New Zealand comedian and television personality. Williams was a co-host on satirical news and entertainment television programme Jono and Ben, until the show's end in 2018. In 2019, he began hosting New Zealand Today, a show detailing the lives and events of New Zealand towns and the people who live in them.

Early life
Williams was born in Christchurch to Gary and Roseanne Williams, and moved to Nelson when he was twelve months old. His younger brother is comedian Paul Williams. He attended primary school at St Joseph's School, and was educated at Nelson College from 2001 to 2005; in 2005 he travelled to Gallipoli with Prime Minister Helen Clark after winning a student essay competition. He was a member of the school's 'A' basketball team from 2003 to 2005.

He attended Victoria University of Wellington, and graduated with a Bachelor of Arts degree majoring in political science in 2011. While at Victoria University he held the positions of Victoria University of Wellington Students Association Activities Officer in 2009, and ran for president in 2010, but withdrew his application for the latter.

Career
Williams began performing stand-up comedy in Wellington in 2007. In 2009 he performed as Dai Henwood's opening act after winning Dai's Protégé Project. He is a regular performer in the New Zealand Comedy Festival in Wellington and Auckland.

In 2010, he started co-hosting on The Jono Project, where he appeared on TVNZ's breakfast show in a prank in which he claimed to be a promoter of commercial whaling in New Zealand as a way to save whales. When the show was merged with WANNA-BEn in 2012 to form Jono and Ben at Ten, Williams followed. He was promoted to co-host in 2013.

In 2012 Williams won the Billy T Award for his debut solo show "On the verge of nothing".

On 15 January 2014, it was announced in a press release that Williams would join The Edge in a new radio show, The Edge Afternoons with Guy, Sharyn & Clint with Sharyn Casey and Clint Roberts. In comedic fashion, he is quoted in the press release as saying: "It has been my dream to work on The Edge radio station ever since last week when they told me I would be working on The Edge radio station. I’m super excited to make my dream a reality." In March 2014, Williams was selected by TV Guide magazine as New Zealand's Sexiest Male Television Personality, beating Shortland Streets Benjamin Mitchell, who had won the award for several years beforehand. He also co-hosted The Xtra Factor, a follow-up programme of The X Factor with Casey and Roberts from March–May 2015.

In June 2015, he began narrating Come Dine with Me New Zealand.

In September 2015, Williams released a charity single entitled "The Pigeon Song", featuring Christchurch rapper Scribe. It peaked at the number two position in the New Zealand singles chart.

He left The Edge in December 2016. At the time, he cited this as being for advancements in his career.

In 2017, he recorded and released his first half hour stand-up special "In an election year" live at Q Theatre in Auckland.

In 2019, he began hosting the satirical news show New Zealand Today, which began as a popular segment on Jono & Ben. The fourth season of the show is currently in development. 

In 2020, Williams competed on the first season of Taskmaster NZ, the New Zealand version of the British television show. His brother, Paul, serves as the Taskmaster's assistant throughout the show.

In 2023, Williams appeared on Guy Montgomery's Guy Mont-Spelling Bee.

Personal life 
Williams was in a relationship with Green Party MP Golriz Ghahraman, which ended in late 2020.

References

External links

1987 births
Living people
New Zealand television personalities
New Zealand comedians
New Zealand male comedians
People educated at Nelson College
People from Nelson, New Zealand
Victoria University of Wellington alumni
The Edge (radio station)